Ghulam Faruque Khan Khattak HPk, CIE, OBE (7 October 1899 – 29 April 1992) was a Pakistani politician and businessman who was the founder of Ghulam Faruque Group.

As a politician, he became Governor of East Pakistan and Federal Minister for Commerce, Science and Technology where he served from 1964 to 1967. He was also member of the National Assembly of Pakistan from 1973 to 1977 and member of the Senate of Pakistan from 1985 to 1991 and again from 1991 until his death. He was also the founder of Pakistani conglomerate Ghulam Faruque Group.

Early life
Ghulam Faruque Khan Khattak was born on October 7, 1899, in Midnapore. He was the son of Khan Mir Aslam Khan Khattak (1841–1922), a landlord, social worker, civil contractor and Muslim leader of Nagpur who donated huge amount of money to Muslims education and always stood for the rights of Muslims. Mir Aslam Khan was a Pashtun of the Akor Khel Khattak tribe and was born in the house of Nawab Khan Khattak. His father was Rasual Khan Khattak of Shaidu Khan Khel, which is a village in Nowshera tehsil, Peshawar District of British India (now in Nowshera District of Khyber-Pakhtunkhwa, in Pakistan). Shaidu is home to the Akor Khel, ruling khel of the Khattak tribe, as well as to the Mohallah Khan Khel (Khel stands for a family or descendants) clan who came here when two sons of Khushal Khan Khattak, named Shahbaz Khan Khattak and Abdul Qadir Khan Khattak, came from Akora Khattak to Shaidu. The two larger groups of Khan Khel descend from the brothers. The Akor Khels, a clan named after Akoray, still hold a prominent position in the Khattak tribe.

He was appointed an Officer of the Order of the British Empire (OBE) in the 1944 New Year Honours, and was appointed a Companion of the Order of the Indian Empire (CIE) in the 1946 New Year Honours.

He was undefeated in every election in which he was a candidate over his entire political career. He defeated Arbab Noor Muhammad Khan in his home town, Peshawar NW.2, in 1970. He was reelected from NW.2 in 1972. He died on April 29, 1992.

Faruque advanced the vision behind the development of the gas fields,  He was integral to the development of the printing company that prints Pakistani currency, setting up Pakistan Industrial Development Corporation & Pakistan's first cement plant and developing the Karachi Shipyard & Engineering Works and establishing Water & Power Development Authority.

Ghulam Faruque Group 

 Cherat Cement Company Ltd
 Cherat Papersack Ltd
 Mirpurkhas Sugar Mills Ltd
 Faruque (Pvt.) Ltd
 Greaves Pakistan (Pvt.) Ltd
 Greaves C.N.G (Pvt.) Ltd
 Greaves Air-Conditioning(Pvt.) Ltd
 Greaves Engineering (Pvt.) Ltd
 Madian Hydro Power Ltd.—A JV Company
 Unicol Ltd.—A JV Company
 Zensoft (Pvt.) Ltd

References 

Pakistani industrialists
Pashtun people
Companions of the Order of the Indian Empire
Officers of the Order of the British Empire
1899 births
1992 deaths
Governors of East Pakistan
Members of the Senate of Pakistan
Pakistani MNAs 1972–1977
Pakistani Members of the Order of the British Empire